The Letov Š-14 was a single-seat, single-engine aircraft, designed and built in Czechoslovakia in the early 1920s. Originally intended as a biplane fighter, it was later modified into a monoplane and entered as a contestant in a speed competition.

Design and development

The Letov Š-14 was designed alongside the Letov Š-13, sharing its Škoda licence-built 300 hp (224 kW) Hispano-Suiza 8Fb water-cooled V-8 engine but not its thick airfoil wings. Like the Š-13, it was intended as a single-seat biplane fighter aircraft. It was of mixed construction, with wooden wings and a metal-framed fuselage.

The wings, mounted without stagger, were straight edged with a constant chord and blunt wingtips. It was a single bay biplane with a pair of interplane struts on each side. These were straight and near parallel, but converged a little towards the narrower chord lower wing. The upper wing was braced to the fuselage with a cabane immediately ahead of the open cockpit, situated below the wing trailing edge.

The Hispano drove a two-blade propeller with a pointed spinner; it was cooled by a rectangular radiator on each side of the fuselage between the wings.  The fuselage was flat sided with rounded decking, tapering aft to the mid-mounted tailplane, where the vertical tail was broad and low.  The Š-14 landed on a fixed conventional tailskid undercarriage.

The Š-14 first flew in 1924 but Letov quickly decided to concentrate their fighter development efforts on the Letov Š-20 which flew the following year. Instead, the Š-14 was rebuilt as a cantilever monoplane to take part in the Third Speed Contest of 1924.

Specifications (biplane)

References

1920s Czechoslovakian fighter aircraft
Letov aircraft
Single-engined tractor aircraft
Parasol-wing aircraft
Aircraft first flown in 1924